Brianne Taylor Reed Pérez (born 2 May 1994) is an American-born Dominican professional footballer who plays as a centre back for Danish Elitedivisionen club FC Nordsjælland and the Dominican Republic women's national team. She previously played for Kvarnsvedens IK in the Damallsvenskan and FC Kansas City in the National Women's Soccer League (NWSL).

Early life
Born and raised in Tinton Falls, New Jersey to an African-American father and a Dominican mother, Reed attended Red Bank Catholic High School. A three-year starter on the varsity soccer team, she helped lead the team to two consecutive Shore Conference titles in 2009 and 2010 and well as three consecutive league championship appearances. In 2010, the team won the Co-State Championship. Reed also was on the varsity track team and was 2012 Monmouth County Triple and Long Jump Champion.

Reed played for club teams Ocean SA Eagles, Wall SC Wombats and PDA Charge. In 2010 she won the New Jersey Olympic Development Program (ODP) state championship and was a member of the finalist team at the 2011 ODP National Championship. She was named to the First Team All-Shore Conference by the Asbury Park Press for two consecutive years in 2010 and 2011. In 2011, she was named to the First Team All-State by The Star-Ledger and received the John Cobb Senior Excellence Award. In 2012, she was the recipient of the Monmouth County Director of Athletics Sportsmanship Award and Jersey Sporting News Player of the Year.

Rutgers Scarlet Knights, 2012–2015
Reed attended Rutgers University from 2012–2016 where she played for the Rutgers Scarlet Knights. During her freshman season, she made 19 appearances. The following year, she started in all 22 matches and scored her first collegiate goal against the University of Connecticut on 24 October 2013. In 2014, she started all 20 matches playing in the centerback position. She was named to the 2014 All-Big Ten First Team and received the Rutgers Junior Female Athlete of the Year Award. The same year, she was named Third Team National Soccer Coaches Association of America (NSCAA) All-American. During her senior season, Reed started all 26 matches. In November 2015, her flip throw-in led to the team's first goal against the Ohio State Buckeyes during the semifinal of the Big Ten Women's Soccer Tournament. Playing in the centerback position, she anchored a defense that recorded a new school record of 770:16 minutes of shutout spanning the team's first nine matches. Reed was a candidate for the Hermann Trophy and ranked the No. 24 player in the country by TopDrawerSoccer.com. She was the recipient of the 2015 Senior CLASS Award and was named to the NSCAA First Team All-Great Lakes Region as well as the All-Big Ten Conference First Team.

Club career

FC Kansas City, 2016–2017
Reed was drafted by FC Kansas City as the 18th pick in the 2016 NWSL College Draft. She signed with Kansas City ahead of the 2016 season. She made seven appearances for the club during the regular season, starting in five of those. Kansas City finished in sixth place with a  record.

Kvarnsveden IK , 2017
Reed was transferred to Kvarnsveden IK from FC Kansas City on 21 July 2017.

Eskilstuna United, 2018-present
On 20 December 2017 she signed with Eskilstuna United.

International career
On 30 June 2021, Reed was called up by the Dominican Republic.

References

External links
 FC Kansas City player profile
 Rutgers player profile
 
 

1994 births
Living people
Citizens of the Dominican Republic through descent
Dominican Republic women's footballers
Women's association football central defenders
Kvarnsvedens IK players
Eskilstuna United DFF players
FC Nordsjælland (women) players
Damallsvenskan players
Dominican Republic women's international footballers
Dominican Republic expatriate women's footballers
Dominican Republic expatriate sportspeople in Sweden
Expatriate women's footballers in Sweden
Dominican Republic expatriate sportspeople in Denmark
Expatriate women's footballers in Denmark
Dominican Republic people of African American descent
People from Tinton Falls, New Jersey
Sportspeople from Monmouth County, New Jersey
Soccer players from New Jersey
American women's soccer players
Red Bank Catholic High School alumni
Rutgers Scarlet Knights women's soccer players
FC Kansas City draft picks
FC Kansas City players
National Women's Soccer League players
American expatriate women's soccer players
American expatriate sportspeople in Sweden
American expatriate sportspeople in Denmark
African-American women's soccer players
American sportspeople of Dominican Republic descent
21st-century African-American sportspeople
21st-century African-American women